Eduard Oleksandrovych Sobol (born 20 April 1995) is a Ukrainian professional footballer who plays as a left-back for Ligue 1 side Strasbourg and the Ukraine national team.

Club career
Sobol was born in Vilniansk, Zaporizhzhia Oblast, Ukraine, in a family of the professional footballer Oleksandr Sobol. He is a product of Metalurh Zaporizhzhia's youth system. Sobol made his debut for FC Metalurhon on 5 November 2011, against FC Enerhetyk Burshtyn in the Ukrainian First League.

In February 2013, Sobol signed a three-year contract with Shakhtar Donetsk.

On 9 May 2018, he played as Slavia Prague won the 2017–18 Czech Cup final against FK Jablonec.

In January 2023, Sobol joined Ligue 1 club Strasbourg on a three-and-a-half year deal.

International career
Sobol was named in the 31-player Ukraine national team squad for the 2018 FIFA World Cup qualification match against Iceland on 5 September 2016.

On 17 November 2020, he tested positive for COVID-19 whilst on international duty with Ukraine.

Career statistics

Club

International

Honours
Shakhtar Donetsk
 Ukrainian Premier League: 2012–13, 2013–14
 Ukrainian Cup: 2012–13
 Ukrainian Super Cup: 2012, 2013, 2014

Slavia Prague
 Czech Cup: 2017–18

Club Brugge
 Belgian First Division A: 2019–20, 2020–21, 2021–22
 Belgian Super Cup: 2021

References

External links
 
 
 

1995 births
Living people
People from Vilniansk
Sportspeople from Zaporizhzhia Oblast
Ukrainian footballers
Association football fullbacks
Ukraine international footballers
Ukraine youth international footballers
Ukraine under-21 international footballers
UEFA Euro 2020 players
Ukrainian Premier League players
Ukrainian First League players
Ukrainian Second League players
Czech First League players
Belgian Pro League players
Ligue 1 players
FC Metalurh Zaporizhzhia players
FC Metalurh-2 Zaporizhzhia players
FC Shakhtar Donetsk players
FC Metalurh Donetsk players
FC Metalist Kharkiv players
FC Zorya Luhansk players
SK Slavia Prague players
FK Jablonec players
Club Brugge KV players
RC Strasbourg Alsace players
Ukrainian expatriate footballers
Ukrainian expatriate sportspeople in the Czech Republic
Expatriate footballers in the Czech Republic
Ukrainian expatriate sportspeople in Belgium
Expatriate footballers in Belgium
Ukrainian expatriate sportspeople in France
Expatriate footballers in France